The Government Funded Technical Institutes (GFTI) are a list of 33 premier technical institutes funded by the Government of India.
As per the official date the number of seats available for academic year 2015 were 9,260 approx. It follows similar academic and admission system as that of NITs and IIITs.

Process of admission
Since the academic year the Joint Seat Allocation Authority (JoSAA) is responsible for conducting admission in 33 government funded technical institute through its website.

The admissions are done on the basis of merit obtained in the Joint Entrance Examination - Main.

The seat allotment is subject to merit whereas seat acceptance is subject to payment of 35,000/- INR for Open and OBC within 2–4 days, and 20,000 INR for Scheduled Castes and Scheduled Tribes. Further seat acceptance does not mean admission, a candidate offered and accepted seat have to personally report to The allotted institute and pay the remaining fees demanded by the respective institute.

29. Chhattisgarh Swami Vivekanand Technical University Bhilai-180

Institutes

References

Technical universities and colleges in India
Government universities and colleges in India